Kuhestan Rural District is a rural district (dehestan) in Rostaq District, Darab County, Fars Province, Iran. At the 2006 census, its population was 5,070, in 1,196 families.  The rural district has 67 villages.

References 

Rural Districts of Fars Province
Darab County